Fred van Doesburg is a Dutch mixed martial artist.

Mixed martial arts record

|-
| Loss
| align=center| 2-2
| Dave Vader
| KO (knee)
| Rings Holland: No Guts, No Glory
| 
| align=center| 1
| align=center| 1:12
| Amsterdam, North Holland, Netherlands
| 
|-
| Win
| align=center| 2-1
| Rick Rootlieb
| Submission (smother)
| Rings Holland: Di Capo Di Tutti Capi
| 
| align=center| 1
| align=center| 4:18
| Utrecht, Netherlands
| 
|-
| Loss
| align=center| 1-1
| Mario Borzic
| Decision (unanimous)
| Rings Holland: Who's The Boss
| 
| align=center| 2
| align=center| 5:00
| Utrecht, Netherlands
| 
|-
| Win
| align=center| 1-0
| Edwin Gertenbach
| Submission (choke)
| FFH: Free Fight Gala
| 
| align=center| 0
| align=center| 0:00
| Beverwijk, North Holland, Netherlands
|

See also
List of male mixed martial artists

References

External links
 Kazuhiro Kusayanagi at fightmatrix.com

Dutch male mixed martial artists
Living people
Place of birth missing (living people)
Year of birth missing (living people)